Berlin grew out of the historical city centre, the Nikolai quarter and its adjacent town of Cölln, both situated along the River Spree. It expanded its territories with areas such as Dorotheenstadt and Friedrichstadt. The creation of Greater Berlin in 1920 incorporated many former independent towns and municipalities such as Spandau, Charlottenburg and Köpenick.

Today, the urban environment of the metropolis also spreads to parts of Brandenburg and Potsdam. The decentralised development has resulted in a plethora of sights in Berlin – not just in the centre of the city, but also in the outlying boroughs. For various reasons among the world's most recognized symbols of Berlin are the Brandenburg Gate and its tallest landmark, the Berlin TV tower in Mitte.

Skyline

World Heritage Sites

Capital buildings

Religious buildings 
 List of places of worship in Berlin

Neighbourhoods

Parks

Monuments

Museums
 List of museums and galleries in Berlin

Entertainment venues

Notable buildings

Happenings

See also 

 Historic cemeteries in Berlin
 Berlin Memorial Plaques
 Alte Kommandantur
 Berlin State Library 
 The Kennedys Museum
 Akademie der Künste
 St. Mary's Church
 St. Nicholas' Church
 Remnants of the old city wall of Berlin-Cölln 
 Philological Library - Free University of Berlin

External links 
 Sights in Berlin

 
Culture in Berlin
Berlin-related lists
Berlin
Berlin